2009 Peshawar bombing may refer to:

Pearl Continental hotel bombing, in June
9 October 2009 Peshawar bombing
28 October 2009 Peshawar bombing
2009 Peshawar judicial complex bombing, in November